Elefante is an alternative rock and pop rock band formed in Mexico City in the early 1990s.  They have released five albums, and their self-titled release was nominated for a Latin Grammy Award in 2005.

History
The group first came to prominence when they opened for Joaquín Sabina at a show at Mexico City's National Auditorium.  After several tours of the Americas, opening for Shakira and Maná, their lead singer Reyli left to pursue a solo career in 2003.  As a replacement they recruited Jorge Martínez Guevara, former lead singer of the group Caos, who performed on their 2005 album Elefante.  He left the group in 2007, and songwriter/guitarist Rafael "Rafa" López and Javi Cantero assumed vocal duties on subsequent releases.

Discography
 El Que Busca Encuentra (2001)
 Lo Que Andabamos Buscando (2002)
 Elefante (2005)
 Resplandor (2007)
 E:87600? (2012)

References

External links
 
 

Latin pop music groups
Musical groups from Mexico City
Rock en Español music groups